Athesis vitrala is a species of butterfly of the family Nymphalidae. It is found in Peru.

References

Ithomiini
Butterflies described in 1918